Steneotarsonemus laticeps, the bulb scale mite, is a species of mite in the family Tarsonemidae, the white mites. Amongst plants attacked by this mite are species of Narcissus.

References

Bibliography 

Trombidiformes
Arachnids of Europe